Nicci may refer to:

 Nicci French, pseudonym of London journalists Nicci Gerrard (born 1958) and Sean French (born 1959)
 Nicci Gerrard (born 1958), London journalist
 Nicci Gilbert (born 1970), member of the American band Brownstone
 Nicci Jolly (born 1981), Scottish television presenter and Miss Scotland, 2003
 Nicci Juice (born 1975), one-time stage name of Nicole Saft, better known as Rollergirl
 Nicci Wright (born 1972), Canadian footballer
 Nicci, a character in The Sword of Truth series by Terry Goodkind

See also
 Nichi, a given name
 Nicki (disambiguation)
 Nikki (disambiguation)